Tomasz Bednarek and Mateusz Kowalczyk were the defending champions but chose not to defend their title.

Federico Gaio and Stefano Napolitano won the title after defeating Marin and Tomislav Draganja 6–7(2–7), 6–2, [10–3] in the final.

Seeds

Draw

References
 Main Draw

BFD Energy Challenger - Doubles